The 2002 UAW-DaimlerChrysler 400 was the third stock car race of the 2002 NASCAR Winston Cup Series and the fifth iteration of the event. The race was held on Sunday, March 3, 2002, in North Las Vegas, Nevada at Las Vegas Motor Speedway, a  permanent D-shaped oval racetrack. The race took the scheduled 267 laps to complete. At race's end, Sterling Marlin, driving for Chip Ganassi Racing, would escape a penalty and hold off the field within the closing laps of the race to win his ninth career NASCAR Winston Cup Series win and his first of the season. To fill out the podium, Jeremy Mayfield of Evernham Motorsports and Mark Martin of Roush Racing would finish second and third, respectively.

Background 

Las Vegas Motor Speedway, located in Clark County, Nevada outside the Las Vegas city limits and about 15 miles northeast of the Las Vegas Strip, is a 1,200-acre (490 ha) complex of multiple tracks for motorsports racing. The complex is owned by Speedway Motorsports, Inc., which is headquartered in Charlotte, North Carolina.

Entry list 

 (R) denotes rookie driver.

Practice

First practice 
The first practice session was held on Friday, March 1, at 10:20 AM PST, and would last for two hours.

Second practice 
The second practice session was held on Saturday, March 2, at 9:30 AM PST, and would last for 45 minutes.

Third and final practice 
The third and final practice session, sometimes referred to as Happy Hour, was held on Saturday, March 2, at 11:15 AM PST, and would last for 45 minutes.

Qualifying 
Qualifying was held on Friday, March 1, at 2:00 PM PST. Each driver would have two laps to set a fastest time; the fastest of the two would count as their official qualifying lap. Positions 1-36 would be decided on time, while positions 37-43 would be based on provisionals. Six spots are awarded by the use of provisionals based on owner's points. The seventh is awarded to a past champion who has not otherwise qualified for the race. If no past champ needs the provisional, the next team in the owner points will be awarded a provisional.

Derrike Cope was the only driver to fail to qualify.

Full qualifying results

Race results

References 

2002 NASCAR Winston Cup Series
NASCAR races at Las Vegas Motor Speedway
March 2002 sports events in the United States
2002 in sports in Nevada